The Leeds municipal elections were held on Thursday 9 May 1963, with one third of the council to be elected.

The Liberals significantly expanded on their prior year's record showing of 10 candidates to 18 candidates this time, obtaining them post-war records in votes and vote share. This hidden a disappointing result for them, seeing swings away from them in the wards they'd fought previously, with Far Headingley the only ward they managed to retain second place in (as well as gaining second place on first standing in Wellington).

This Liberal advancement again mainly hurt the Conservative vote, helping Labour achieve a 2.3% swing to make six gains – reversing all but one of the gains the Tories made in their 1960 victory (the exception being the usually reliable Conservative ward of Harehills, which Labour managed to narrowly gain in 1957). These gains doubled Labour's majority of councillors – with their overall majority now at 28 – as the party made widespread gains nationally to capture a record number of borough seats.

Election result

The result had the following consequences for the total number of seats on the council after the elections:

Ward results

Casual Vacancies

References

1963 English local elections
1963
1960s in Leeds